H02 is a regional road (H-Highway) in Kyiv Oblast and Ternopil Oblast, Ukraine. It runs west-east and connects Radyvyliv with Sofiivka. The section from Kremenets to Rzhyshchiv was previously a portion of P32.

Main route
Main route and connections to/intersections with other highways in Ukraine.

See also
 Roads in Ukraine

References

External links
Regional Roads in Ukraine in Russian

Roads in Lviv Oblast
Roads in Ternopil Oblast